THURBO is a railway company with S-Bahn-style services in Switzerland (cantons of Aargau, Grisons, Schaffhausen, St. Gallen, Thurgau, Zürich), southern Germany (states of Baden-Württemberg, Bavaria), and northeastern Vorarlberg, Austria, jointly owned by Swiss Federal Railways (90%) and the Canton of Thurgau.

It operates regional transport on a network of 658 km belonging to SBB CFF FFS, with the exception of the route Wil–Weinfelden–Konstanz, which is only maintained by the latter and except tracks in Austria and Germany. As of 2022, the company owns 110 EMUs and carries 25.8 million passengers a year.

The acronym THURBO (pronounced as Tour-bo in German) is derived from the Thur River (or the Canton of Thurgau, respectively) and the first two letters of Bodensee (German name for Lake Constance), probably on the basis of the homophone turbo.

Description
THURBO was founded in September 2001 by Swiss Federal Railways (SBB CFF FFS) and Mittelthurgau-Bahn (MThB). Its main business is regional passenger traffic. Infrastructure Kreuzlingen - Weinfelden - Wil SG, taken over from Mittelthurgau-Bahn, is operated by THURBO but maintained by SBB CFF FFS.

Several ZVV lines of Zürich S-Bahn are also operated by THURBO, for example the S26 service in the canton of Zürich between Winterthur and Rüti ZH, or the S36 between Bülach and Waldshut (Germany). Due to increased demand, some services previously operated by THURBO are now operated by SBB CFF FFS using either double-deck EMUs (e.g., RABe 511) or Re 450 class locomotives pushing or pulling double-deck passenger carriages.

THURBO also operates a RegioExpress (RE) between Herisau and Konstanz (Germany) nicknamed der Konstanzer by locals.

Operation

Former Mittelthurgaubahn 
 –– (–)

RegioExpress 
  ––––

Schaffhausen S-Bahn  
  ––Neuhausen Badischer Bahnhof–
  –––
  –– (Rhyhas, since 2022)

St. Gallen S-Bahn 
  ––––––
  ––––––
  –––––
  ––– (––Lindau-Reutin)
  ––
  –––
  –––
  ––
  –– (express)
  ––
  ––

Previous operations 
 S3 – (until 2021, merged with the former S5 into the current S5 of St. Gallen S-Bahn)
 S8 –– (until 2021, merged with the former S1 into the current S1 of St. Gallen S-Bahn)

Zürich S-Bahn 
 
 
  (operated by SBB CFF FFS during peak hour since 2022)

Previous operations 
 S22 ––––– (until 2015, subsumed into S9 and S24 of Zürich S-Bahn, respectively)
  (until 2018, now operated by SBB CFF FFS)
  (until 2018, now operated by SBB CFF FFS)

Rolling stock

THURBO's fleet consists of

 41 GTW 2/6 EMUs (RABe 526 701–751)
 39 GTW 2/8 EMUs (RABe 526 752–790; 781–790 ex 709–718)
 12 GTW 2/8 EMUs on order (RABe 526 791–802)
 10 GTW 2/6 EMUs (RABe 526 680–689)

External links
 Website of Thurbo AG

References

TH
Canton of Schaffhausen
Transport in Thurgau
Transport in the canton of St. Gallen
Transport in the canton of Zürich
Railway companies established in 2001
Swiss companies established in 2001